Swati (born 14 May 1993) is an Indian field hockey player and is a member of the India women's national field hockey team. She hails from Haryana and plays as the goalkeeper.

Career 
In January 2018, Swati was part of the 33-members Indian Women’s Players for the national camp starting in Bengaluru’s Sports Authority of India campus on January 3.

Swati made her debut on 5 March 2018 in Seoul, where India played Korea as part of the Korea tour and Swati's crucial save in the 23rd minute denied the hosts a penalty corner. In the fourth quarter, she made some important saves and saved two penalty corners in the last quarter. In this match,  India beat Korea for a score of 1-0.

In April 2018, Swati was also part of the 61-players for the senior women national camp in Bengaluru’s Sports Authority of India campus.

In June 2018, Swati was part of the 20-member Indian women’s hockey team touring Spain as goalkeeper.

References 

Living people
1993 births
Indian female field hockey players
Field hockey players from Haryana
Sportswomen from Haryana